Wa Shan Tsuen is a village in Sheung Shui, North District, Hong Kong near the Ng Tung River.

Administration
Wa Shan is a recognized village under the New Territories Small House Policy. Wa Shan Tsuen is one of the villages represented within the Sheung Shui District Rural Committee. For electoral purposes, Wa Shan Tsuen is part of the Fung Tsui constituency, which was formerly represented by Chiang Man-ching until July 2021.

References

External links
 Delineation of area of existing village Wa Shan Tsuen (Sheung Shui) for election of resident representative (2019 to 2022)

Villages in North District, Hong Kong
Sheung Shui